The Saarland is a state of Germany in the south west of the country. Saarbrücken is the state capital and largest city; other cities include Neunkirchen and Saarlouis.

Having long been a relatively small part of the long-contested territories along the Franco-German linguistic border, Saarland first gained specific economic and strategic importance in the nineteenth century due to the wealth of its coal deposits and the heavy industrialization that grew as a result. Saarland was first established as a distinct political entity in 1920 after World War I as the Territory of the Saar Basin, which was occupied and governed by France under a League of Nations mandate. 

Saarland was returned to Nazi Germany in the 1935 Saar status referendum. Following World War II, the French military administration in Allied-occupied Germany organized the territory as the Saar Protectorate on 16 February 1946. After the 1955 Saar Statute referendum, it joined the Federal Republic of Germany as a state on 1 January 1957. Saarland used its own currency, the Saar franc, and postage stamps issued specially for the territory until 1959.

History

Before World War I 

The region of the Saarland was settled by the Celtic tribes of Treveri and Mediomatrici. The most impressive relic of their time is the remains of a fortress of refuge at Otzenhausen in the north of the Saarland. In the 1st century BC, the Roman Empire made the region part of its province of Belgica. The Celtic population mixed with the Roman immigrants. The region gained wealth, which can still be seen in the remains of Roman villas and villages.

Roman rule ended in the 5th century, when the Franks conquered the territory. For the next 1,300 years the region shared the history of the Kingdom of the Franks, the Carolingian Empire and the Holy Roman Empire. The region of the Saarland was divided into several small territories, some of which were ruled by sovereigns of adjoining regions. Most important of the local rulers were the counts of Nassau-Saarbrücken. Within the Holy Roman Empire these territories gained a wide range of independence, threatened, however, by the French kings, who sought, from the 17th century onwards, to incorporate all the territories on the western side of the river Rhine and repeatedly invaded the area in 1635, in 1676, in 1679, and in 1734, extending their realm to the river Saar and establishing the city and stronghold of Saarlouis in 1680.

It was not the king of France but the armies of the French Revolution who terminated the independence of the states in the region of the Saarland. After 1792 they conquered the region and made it part of the French Republic. While a strip in the west belonged to the Moselle department, the centre in 1798 became part of the Sarre department, and the east became part of the Mont-Tonnerre department. After the defeat of Napoleon in 1815, the region was divided again. Most of it became part of the Prussian Rhine Province. Another part in the east, corresponding to the present Saarpfalz district, was allocated to the Kingdom of Bavaria. A small part in the northeast was ruled by the Duke of Oldenburg.

On 31 July 1870, the French Emperor Napoleon III ordered an invasion across the River Saar to seize Saarbrücken. The first shots of the Franco-Prussian War of 1870/71 were fired on the heights of Spichern, south of Saarbrücken. The Saar region became part of the German Empire which came into existence on 18 January 1871, during the course of this war.

Interwar history 

In 1920 the Saargebiet was occupied by Britain and France under the provisions of the Treaty of Versailles. The occupied area included portions of the Prussian Rhine Province and the Bavarian Rhenish Palatinate. In practice the region was administered by France. In 1920 this was formalized by a 15-year League of Nations mandate.

In 1933, a considerable number of communists and other political opponents of National Socialism fled to the Saar, as it was the only part of Germany that remained outside national administration following the First World War. As a result, anti-Nazi groups agitated for the Saarland to remain under French administration. However, with most of the population being ethnically German, such views were considered suspect or even treasonous, and therefore found little support.

When the original 15-year term was over, a plebiscite was held in the territory on 13 January 1935: 90.8% of those voting favoured rejoining Germany.

Nazi period 
Following the referendum Josef Bürckel was appointed on 1 March 1935 as the German Reich's commissioner for reintegration. In September 1939, in response to the German invasion of Poland, French forces invaded the Saarland in a half-hearted offensive, occupying some villages and meeting little resistance, before withdrawing. He died on 28 September 1944 and was succeeded by Willi Stöhr, who remained in office until the region fell to advancing American forces in March 1945.

History after World War II 

After World War II, the Saarland came under French occupation and administration again, as the Saar Protectorate. France did not annex the Saar or expel the local German population, in contrast to the fate of Upper Silesia which was annexed by Poland in 1949 in accordance with the peace treaty between Poland and the GDR/East Germany (see also Allied-occupied Germany). In his speech "Restatement of Policy on Germany", made in Stuttgart on 6 September 1946, United States Secretary of State James F. Byrnes stated the U.S. position on detaching the Saar from Germany: "The United States does not feel that it can deny to France, which has been invaded three times by Germany in 70 years, its claim to the Saar territory".

The Saar and Ruhr areas were historically a central location for coal mining. This attracted the steel industry, which is essential for the production of munitions. The Treaty of Paris (1951) established the European Coal and Steel Community, which led to the termination of the International Authority for the Ruhr (whose purpose was to regulate Ruhr coal and steel production and distribution). However, the Treaty sidestepped the issue of the Saar protectorate: an attached protocol stated Germany and France agreed the Treaty would have no bearing on their views of the status of the Saar.

In 1948, the French government established the Saarland University under the auspices of the University of Nancy. It is the principal university in the state, the other being  (HTW Saar).

The Saar Protectorate was headed by a military governor from 30 August 1945: Gilbert Yves Edmond Grandval (1904–1981), who remained, on 1 January 1948, as High Commissioner, and January 1952 – June 1955 as the first of two French ambassadors, his successor being Éric de Carbonnel (1910–1965) until 1956.
Saarland, however, was allowed a regional administration very early, consecutively headed by:
a president of the Government:
31 July 1945 – 8 June 1946: Hans Neureuther, non-party
a chairman of the (until 15 December 1947, Provisional) Administration Commission:
 8 June 1946 – 20 December 1947: Erwin Müller (1906–1968), non-party
Minister-presidents (as in any state):
20 December 1947 – 29 October 1955:  Johannes Hoffmann (1890–1967), CVP
29 October 1955 – 10 January 1956  Heinrich Welsch (1888–1976), non-party
10 January 1956 – 4 June 1957: Hubert Ney (1892–1984), CDU

It was signed as an agreement between the two countries on 23 October 1954 as one of the Paris Pacts, but a plebiscite held on 23 October 1955 rejected it by 67.7%.

On 27 October 1956, the Saar Treaty declared that Saarland should be allowed to join the Federal Republic of Germany, which it did on 1 January 1957. This was the last significant international border change in Europe until the fall of Communism over 30 years later.

After unification, the Saar franc remained as the territory's currency until West Germany's Deutsche Mark replaced it on 7 July 1959. The Saar Treaty established that French, not English as in the rest of West Germany, should remain the first foreign language taught in Saarland schools; this provision was still largely followed after it was no longer binding.

Since 1971, Saarland has been a member of SaarLorLux, a euroregion created from Saarland, Lorraine, Luxembourg, Rhineland Palatinate, and Wallonia.

Geography 

The state borders France (department of Moselle, which forms part of the region of Grand Est) to the south and west, Luxembourg (Grevenmacher District) to the west and Rhineland-Palatinate to the north and the east. It is named after the river Saar, a tributary of the Moselle (itself a tributary of the Rhine), which runs through the state from the south to the northwest.

While slightly larger than the combined area of the three city-states, Saarland is by far the smallest of the Flächenländer ("area-states"). It is less than one sixth the size of Schleswig-Holstein, the next smallest German state. One third of the land area of the Saarland is covered by forest, one of the highest percentages in Germany.

Most inhabitants live in a city agglomeration on the French border, surrounding the capital of Saarbrücken.

See also List of places in Saarland.

 Saar-Warndt coal mining basin

Districts
Saarland is divided into six districts:

 Merzig-Wadern
 Neunkirchen
 Saarbrücken
 Saarlouis
 Saarpfalz-Kreis
 Sankt Wendel

Demographics

Largest cities

The following table shows the ten largest cities of Saarland:

Vital statistics
Births from January–June 2016 =  3,880
Births from January–June 2017 =  4,023
Deaths from January–June 2016 =  6,434
Deaths from January–June 2017 =  6,942
Natural growth from January–June 2016 =  -2,554
Natural growth from January–June 2017 =  -2,919

Religion
Saarland is the most religious state in Germany. The adherents of the Catholic Church comprise 56.8% of the population, organised in the two dioceses of Trier (comprising the formerly Prussian part of Saarland) and Speyer (for the smaller eastern formerly Palatine part). 17.5% of the Saarlandic population adhere to the Evangelical Church in Germany (EKD), organised in the two Landeskirchen named Evangelical Church in the Rhineland and Evangelical Church of the Palatinate, both following the same former territorial partition. 25.7% are not affiliated with one of these churches.

Saarland has the highest concentration of Roman Catholics of any German state, and is the only state in which Catholics form an absolute majority (over 50%).

Politics

Except for the periods between 1985 and 1999, as well as since 2022 – when the centre-left Social Democratic Party of Germany (SPD) has held a majority of seats in the Landtag (state diet) – the centre-right Christian Democratic Union (CDU) has governed the Saarland, either alone or in coalition, since the accession of the state to the Federal Republic of Germany in 1957.

After the 2022 state elections the previous Grand Coalition between the CDU and SPD, the two largest parties in the Landtag, was replaced by an SPD majority government, the only single-party majority government of any German state, led by minister-president Anke Rehlinger.

Current government of the Saarland

Economy
The gross domestic product (GDP) of the state was €35.4 billion in 2018, accounting for 1.1% of German economic output. GDP per capita adjusted for purchasing power was €32,800 or 109% of the EU27 average in the same year. The GDP per employee was 93% of the EU average. The GDP per capita was the second lowest of all states in West Germany.

Important income sources are the automobile industry, steel industry, ceramic industry and computer science and information systems industry. In the past, coal mining was an important branch of industry. However, the last coal mine in Saarland closed in 2012, ending 250 years of coal mining history in the region. The decision to close the mines was motivated by safety concerns about earthquakes in the region.

The unemployment rate stood at 5.8% in October 2018 and was higher than the national average but below the EU28 average.

Education 

Saarland is home to the Saarland University and the administrative headquarters of the Franco-German University.

Culture

Local dialect

People in the Saarland speak Rhine Franconian (in the southeast, very similar to that dialect spoken in the western part of the Palatinate) and Moselle Franconian (in the northwest, very similar to that dialect spoken along the river Moselle and the cities of Trier or even in Luxembourg). Outside of the Saarland, specifically the Rhine-Franconian variant spoken in the state capital Saarbrücken is generally considered to be the Saarland dialect.

In general, both dialects are an integral part of Saarland identity.

Both dialects, particularly in their respective Saarland flavour, share many characteristic features, some of which will be explained below.

Women and girls are often referred to using the neuter pronoun , with the pronunciation being something like :  (it told me so', instead of she told me so';). This stems from the word  (girl) being neuter ( is correct when referring to words like  but would not be used by itself in reference to a woman).

Declension is rather different:
The genitive case does not exist at all and is entirely replaced by constructs with the dative case.
In most instances, words are not altered when in the dative case. Exceptions are mostly pronouns.
The same holds for the accusative case. It is accepted practice to use the nominative case instead of the accusative.

Diphthongs are less common than in Standard German. This is because the Standard German diphthongs ei and au are each the result of a merger of two Middle High German vowels – however, these mergers did not take place in the Saarland, and only one of the two merged vowels is pronounced as a diphthong.  The front rounded vowels ö, ü, and eu are replaced by e, i, and ei respectively.

French has had a considerable influence on the vocabulary, although the pronunciation of imported French words is usually quite different from their originals. Popular examples include  (from ),  (from ), and the imperative or greeting  (from ).

The English sentence "My house is green" is pronounced almost the same in the Rhine Franconian variant: .  The main difference lies in the pronunciation of the  sound.

Regional beer brewer Karlsberg has taken advantage of the Saarlandish dialect to create clever advertising for its staple product, UrPils. Examples include a trio of men enjoying a beer, flanked by baby carriages, the slogan reading  (meaning "Mum's at work" in Saarlandish, but plays on the High German word  'motherhood'); another depicts a trio of men at a bar, with one realizing his beer has been drunk by one of the others, the slogan reading  (meaning "It was no one" [] in Saarlandish, but playing on the High German word  'connoisseur', translating to "It was a connoisseur"); a third shows an empty beer crate in outer space, the text reading  (meaning "empty" in Saarlandish, but playing on the same High German word meaning "outer space").

French
The French language has a special standing in Saarland due to its geographical proximity to France. Today, a large part of the population is able to speak French, and it is compulsory at many schools. Saarbrücken is also home to a bilingual  (German-French high school). In January 2014 the Saarland state government announced its aim of making the region fully bilingual in German and French by 2043.

Sports
The Saar competed in the qualifying section of the 1954 FIFA World Cup, but failed after coming second to West Germany but ahead of Norway. It also competed as Saar in the 1952 Summer Olympics  and the field handball world championships in the beginning of the 1950s.

Museums 
Feinmechanisches Museum Fellenbergmühle
Grube Düppenweiler
Haus Ludwig
Kunstforum Baden-Badener Versicherung, a former art museum from 1992 to 2016
Zentrum für Biodokumentation

Notes

References

Further reading
 Long, Bronson. No Easy Occupation: French Control of the German Saar, 1944-1957 (Boydell & Brewer, 2015).
 Wiskemann, Elizabeth. "The Saar" History Today (Aug 1953) 3$8 pp 553–560.

External links

Official governmental portal
Statistics office
 Describes the contest for the Saar over the centuries.

 
NUTS 1 statistical regions of the European Union
States and territories established in 1957
1957 establishments in West Germany
States of Germany